Gus G. Russo (born 1950 in Baltimore, Maryland) is an American author and researcher of the assassination of John F. Kennedy.

Russo was part of a team of researchers that worked on the 1993 Frontline Lee Harvey Oswald documentary, Who Was Lee Harvey Oswald?, for PBS. He is the author of Live by the Sword: The Secret War Against Castro and the Death of JFK, a book which states that Lee Harvey Oswald alone killed the president in retribution for Kennedy's policies toward Fidel Castro and Cuba.

Russo has also written books about the Chicago Outfit and mob lawyer Sidney Korshak. In The Outfit, Russo points out that while the Mafia is responsible for heinous crimes, they aren't the only "business" that engages in destructive and illegal activities. The Mafia's "upper world" counterparts, big business, has been responsible for many crimes themselves (white collar crime), have escaped punishment, and still operate without being prosecuted.

Co-authored by Stephen Molton, Brothers In Arms: The Kennedys, the Castros, and the Politics of Murder states that Castro's regime employed Oswald in retaliation for plots against the Cuban leader.

Personal life
As of 2013, Russo was a resident of Catonsville, Maryland.

Books
Supermob: How Sidney Korshak and His Criminal Associates Became America's Hidden Power Brokers, by Gus Russo (2006)
The Outfit: The Role of Chicago's Underworld in the Shaping of Modern America, by Gus Russo (2003)
Gangsters and Goodfellas: The Mob, Witness Protection, and Life on the Run, by Henry Hill, Gus Russo (As Told to) (2004 {hardcover}, 2007 {paperback})
Live by the Sword: The Secret War Against Castro and the Death of JFK, by Gus Russo (1998)
Brothers In Arms: The Kennedys, the Castros, and the Politics of Murder, by Gus Russo and Stephen Molton
Boomer Days, by Gus Russo (2011)

References

External links 
 

1950 births
Living people
American male journalists
American non-fiction writers
Researchers of the assassination of John F. Kennedy
Writers from Baltimore
20th-century American journalists